Gerhard Oswald "Geert" Lotsij (13 January 1878 in Dordrecht – 29 June 1959 in Hilversum) was a Dutch rower who competed in the 1900 Summer Olympics.

He was part of the Dutch boat Minerva Amsterdam, which won the silver medal in the coxed fours final B.

He is the older brother of Paul Lotsij.

References

External links

 profile

1878 births
1959 deaths
Olympic rowers of the Netherlands
Rowers at the 1900 Summer Olympics
Olympic silver medalists for the Netherlands
Sportspeople from Dordrecht
Olympic medalists in rowing
Dutch male rowers
Medalists at the 1900 Summer Olympics